SK Tatran Poštorná was a football club from Poštorná in the South Moravian Region of the Czech Republic. The club played in the Czech 2. Liga, most recently in the 1999–2000 season.

Historical names
 1930 – SK Poštorná (Sportovní klub Poštorná)
 1949 – JTO Sokol Poštorná (Jednotná tělovýchovná organisace Sokol Poštorná)
 1951 – ZSJ Sokol TODOZA Poštorná (Závodní sokolská jednota Sokol Továrna dopravního zařízení Poštorná)
 1952 – ZSJ Spartak Poštorná (Závodní sokolská jednota Spartak Poštorná)
 1953 – DSO Baník Poštorná (Dobrovolná sportovní organisace Baník Poštorná)
 1959 – TJ Tatran Poštorná (Tělovýchovná jednota Tatran Poštorná)
 1962 – TJ Tatran PKZ Poštorná (Tělovýchovná jednota Poštorenské keramické závody Tatran Poštorná)
 1988 – TJ Tatran Fosfa Poštorná (Tělovýchovná jednota Tatran Fosfa Poštorná)
 1992 – FC Tatran Poštorná (Football Club Tatran Poštorná)
 1999 – SK Tatran Poštorná (Sportovní klub Tatran Poštorná)

Postorna
Association football clubs established in 1930
Association football clubs disestablished in 2012
Břeclav District
1930 establishments in Czechoslovakia
2012 disestablishments in the Czech Republic